Eisbär was a steam-powered Kriegsmarine port icebreaker built at Eriksbergs Mekaniska Verkstad in Göteborg, Sweden, in 1942. She had two triple-expansion steam engines driving one propeller in the stern and another in the bow of the vessel.

In 1946, Eisbär was handed over to the Soviet Union as war reparations and renamed Ilya Muromets after the Russian folk hero. She was first used by the Soviet Navy until 1957 and afterwards as a port icebreaker in Vladivostok by the Far Eastern Shipping Company until 1979. Ilya Muromets was broken up in 1981.

In the 1950s, the hull form of Ilya Muromets was used as the basis for the development of the diesel-electric Project 97 icebreakers.

References 

Icebreakers of Germany
Ships built in Gothenburg
1941 ships